Chen Qingzhi was a prominent general of the Liang dynasty. He is best known for his campaign in 530 to crush Northern Wei. With rumor that only 7,000 soldiers, he invaded Northern Wei and conquered the regions of Henan and Shandong. However, he lost them again after being counterattacked by a Wei force ten times larger. Despite this, his success in conquering Northern China, albeit briefly, with rumor that only 7,000 soldiers made him a famous commander in Chinese history.

Campaign against the Northern Wei
In 530 AD, Chen Qingzhi, with only 7,000 troops, invaded Northern Wei, to make Yuan Hao Emperor of Northern Wei. At Liangguo, Chen's 7,000 men defeated Qiu Daqian's Northern Wei army of 70,000 men in a battle that lasted half a day, and Qiu Daqian surrendered. Chen then attacked Kaocheng, held by Yuan Huiye with 20,000 Northern Wei imperial guards. The city fell and Yuan was captured.

Next, Chen attacked Xingyang, but was unable to take it because of its strong garrison of 70,000 troops. A Northern Wei army of 300,000 under Yuan Tianmu and Erzhu Tumo'er was arriving soon to relieve Xingyang, so Chen rallied his men with a speech:

"Ever since we entered Wei territory, we have been capturing land, slaughtering many people in the cities we took. You have killed many peoples' fathers and brothers, and taken many people's children as slaves. Yuan Tianmu's soldiers are all our bitter enemies now. We have only 7,000 men, but the barbarians have over 300,000. Today, the only way for us to survive against the odds is to resolve to fight and die. The barbarians have too many cavalry for us to handle, so we cannot engage them on the plain. We should take advantage of their not having arrived yet, and attack Xingyang with all we've got, capture it, and then hold out. Let's not hesitate. It's time to take some heads!"

Chen then led his troops to storm the walls of Xingyang, capturing it at last. However, more than 500 Liang soldiers were killed or injured. Before long, Yuan Tianmu and Erzhu Tumo'er arrived with their 300,000 troops, straight from Ji'nan (in Shandong). They surrounded Xingyang, but Chen led 3,000 cavalries out and smashed them (against odds of 100 to 1). Next, Chen moved west and attacked the Hulao Pass, and the Wei commanding general Erzhu Shilong abandoned the Pass and fled. Luoyang was left open to attack by Chen, and the Northern Wei emperor Yuan Ziyou abandoned the city and fled across the Yellow River to Henei. Chen was thus able to enter the capital city with his army and set Yuan Hao up as the new Northern Wei emperor.

Unfortunately, Yuan Hao did not wish to remain a puppet of the Liang dynasty and refused Chen's request for more elite Liang reinforcements. To prevent Chen from getting reinforcements behind his back, he even wrote to Xiao Yan claiming that the situation was under control and that it would be unwise to send more Liang occupation troops in, in case it aroused more resentment among the people of the captured Northern Wei cities. Xiao Yan thus halted the movement of reinforcements from the Liang-Wei border. To make matters worse, Chen's soldiers committed abuses and atrocities on the people of Luoyang, losing all local support, while Yuan Hao also proved an inept and self-indulgent ruler.

Within less than two months of Yuan Hao's entry into Luoyang, the Northern Wei loyalist counterattack succeeded despite fierce resistance from Chen's army, and Yuan Hao fled from the city. Chen led his troops on an orderly retreat, pursued by Erzhu Rong. But his army was caught in a flash flood at the Mount Song River (outside Luoyang), and almost completely destroyed - most of the troops either died or deserted. Chen himself escaped back to the south after shaving his head and disguising himself as a monk.

Modern research
Modern historians believe that the numbers of soldiers that the Chinese tradition states are exaggerated. New research concludes that Chen merely defeated Yuan's vanguard of 5,000 barbarian horsemen led by Erzhu Tumo'er, and another vanguard of 9,000 men led by Lu An.

Yuan Tianmu's 300,000 men never arrived at Xinyang. Luoyang, the capital of Northern Wei, was taken by Yuan Hao rather than Chen. Yuan Hao wasn't a puppet of Chen and probably had a bigger army. Yuan Tianmu debated with his staff and court dignitaries on whether to take Luoyang back right away, or to follow the fleeing Wei emperor north which he went with.

There was no mention of Xingyang. Two months later, Northern Wei's first general, Erzhu Rong, came back with a large force to retake Luoyang. Chen was of course unable to stop that. The story of 3,000 versus 300,000 was in the Book of Liang, a version of history written by Chen's side. Records from Wei's side did not mention the same battle.

Popular culture
Chen Qingzhi is one of the 32 historical figures who appear as special characters in the video game Romance of the Three Kingdoms XI by Koei.

Sources
Book of Liang.

Liang dynasty generals
Year of death unknown
484 births
539 deaths
People from Yixing
Generals from Jiangsu
Deified Chinese people